A Maker-Breaker game is a kind of positional game. Like most positional games, it is described by its set of positions/points/elements and its family of winning-sets (- a family of subsets of ). It is played by two players, called Maker and Breaker, who alternately take previously-untaken elements.

In a Maker-Breaker game, Maker wins if he manages to hold all the elements of a winning-set, while Breaker wins if he manages to prevent this, i.e. to hold at least one element in each winning-set. Draws are not possible. In each Maker-Breaker game, either Maker or Breaker has a winning strategy. The main research question about these games is which of these two options holds.

Examples 
A classic Maker-Breaker game is Hex. There, the winning-sets are all paths from the left side of the board to the right side. Maker wins by owning a connected path; Breaker wins by owning a connected path from top to bottom, since it blocks all connected paths from left to right.

Tic-tac-toe can be played as a Maker-Breaker game: in that variant, the goal of Maker is to pick 3 squares in a row, and the goal of Breaker is just to prevent Maker from doing so. In that variant, Maker has a winning strategy. This is in contrast to the classic variant (which is a Strong positional game) where the second player has a drawing strategy (see Strong positional game#Comparison to Maker-Breaker game).

Unordered CNF Game on a positive CNF (all positive literals) can be considered as a Maker-Breaker game where Maker wants to falsify the CNF, and Breaker wants to satisfy it.

For instance, the Shannon switching game is a Maker-Breaker game in which the winning sets are the paths between two distinguished vertices.

Breaker-Maker duality 
In a Maker-Breaker game, usually Maker plays first. But it is also possible to let Breaker play first. Playing first is always advantageous: any winning strategy for Maker playing second on  yields a winning strategy for Maker playing first on  The same is true for Breaker.

Moreover, for every game  we can define its transversal game , in which the winning-sets are the minimal sets touching each winning-set in the original game. For example, if in the original game the winning-sets are { {1,2,3},{4,5,6} } then in the dual game they are { {1,4}, {1,5}, {1,6}, {2,4}, {2,5}, {2,6}, {3,4}, {3,5}, {3,6} }.

Computational Complexity 
Maker-Breaker game is PSPACE-complete even if the size of each set is restricted to 6.  The first result was from 1978 where the size of each set was restricted to 11, where the game was mentioned as (POS CNF 11).

Strategies 
Several kinds of strategies are commonly used to solve Maker-Breaker games.

Pairing Strategies 

In some games, it is possible to partition the elements of X (or a subset of them) into a set of pairwise-disjoint pairs. Under certain conditions, a player can win using the following greedy strategy: "whenever your opponent picks an element of pair i, pick the other element of pair i".

The "certain conditions" are different for Maker and for Breaker; see pairing strategy.

Strategies from strong positional games 

Every winning-strategy for First in a strong positional game, is also a winning strategy for Maker in the maker-breaker variant (see Strong positional game#Comparison to Maker-Breaker game). In particular, if in the strong-positional variant there can be no draw, then in the maker-breaker variant Maker has a winning strategy.  The opposite is not necessarily true: a winning-strategy for Maker in the maker-breaker variant is not necessarily a winning-strategy for First in the strong variant, since in the strong variant, Second can win by claiming a winning-set before First.

In contrast, every winning-strategy for Breaker in a maker-breaker game, is also a drawing-strategy for Second in the strong-positional variant.

Potential-based strategies 
Suppose we can find a function that assigns, to each winning-set, a potential based on the number of elements already taken from it by Maker/Breaker. The potential function should satisfy the following properties:

 The potential of a winning-set is between 0 and 1;
 When Breaker takes an element, the potential of all sets containing it drops to 0 and remains 0;
 When Maker takes an element, the potential of all (non-broken) sets containing it increases;
 The potential of a set owned by Maker is 1.

Then, Maker wins iff the potential-sum is more than 0, and Breaker wins iff the potential-sum is less than 1. Hence:

 If the initial sum is more than 0, and Maker can play such that the potential-sum weakly increases, then this is a winning strategy for Maker;
 If the initial sum is less than 1, and Breaker can play such that the potential-sum weakly decreases, then this is a winning strategy for Breaker.

A winning condition for Breaker 
Paul Erdős and John Selfridge presented a general condition that guarantees Breaker a winning strategy. They used a potential-based strategy. So the potential of a set occupied by Maker is indeed   . To every element, we assign a value which equals the total potential-increase in case Maker takes it, i.e., . The winning strategy of Breaker is pick an element with a highest value. This guarantees that, from the first turn of Breaker onwards, the potential always weakly decreases. Hence, if the potential at the first Breaker turn is less than 1, Breaker wins. In Maker's first turn, he can, at most, double the potential (by taking an element contained in all winning-sets). Therefore, it is sufficient that, at the game start, the potential is less than 1/2. To summarize, the Erdős-Selfridge theorem says that:

If , then is Breaker's win.

The theorem gives a very easy-to-check condition, and when this condition is satisfied, it also gives an efficient algorithm for computing Breaker's optimal strategy.

The potential function has a probabilistic interpretation. The potential of a winning-set is the probability that, if the game is played randomly from now on, Maker will own that set. The potential-sum is thus the expected number of winning-sets owned by Maker if the game is played randomly. Whenever the potential-sum is less than 1, there must be a way to play the game such that the number of sets owned by Maker is 0. By ensuring that the potential-sum remains below 1, Breaker essentially de-randomizes this probabilistic claim until at the end of the game, it becomes a certainty.

The number is tight: there are  -uniform hypergraphs where the number of winning sets is exactly  , and where Maker has a winning strategy. For example, consider a perfect binary tree of height . It has leaves. Define V as the set of tree nodes, and H as the family of all  paths from the root to a leaf. Maker starts by picking the root. Then, if Breaker picks an element in the left subtree, Maker picks the root of the right subtree, and vice versa. By continuing this way, Maker can always pick a full path, i.e., a winning-set.

Disjoint and almost-disjoint hypergraphs 
If all winning-sets are pairwise-disjoint and their size is at least 2, then Breaker can win using a pairing strategy.

Suppose now that the winning-sets are almost disjoint, i.e., any two winning-sets have at most one element in common.  If all winning-sets are of size , and the number of winning sets is less than (for some fixed constant c), then Breaker has a winning strategy.  So this situation is easier for Breaker than the general case, but harder than the case of disjoint winning-sets.

A winning condition for Maker 
Define the degree of a set of elements as the number of different winning-sets that contain this set. Define the pair-degree of a set-family, denoted , as the maximum degree of a pair of elements (maximum over all pairs).

The value of an element is the total potential-decrease if Breaker takes that element, which is the same as the total potential-increase if Maker takes it. Maker's strategy is simply to take the highest-value element.

Therefore, if we consider only the winning-sets that were touched once, the potential-sum weakly increases. The potential-sum can decrease only due to sets that contain both Maker's element and Breaker's element. These sets gain but then lose , so all in all they lose . Since such sets have at least two elements, each such set loses at most 1/4. By the limited-pair-degree assumption, the number of such sets is at most d2. Hence, after each round the potential-sum drops by at most d2/4. The number of rounds is |X|/2, so the final potential is smaller than the initial potential by at most .

If , the final potential is more than 0, so there is at least one winning-set with potential 1. This set is owned by Maker.

Chromatic numbers and winning strategies 
The chromatic number of is the smallest number of colors needed to color the elements of X such that no single set in is monochromatic.

Summary table 
The following table summarizes some conditions that guarantee that one of the players has a winning strategy. The condition in the "tightness" column indicates when specific hypergraphs are known on which the strategy stops working.

In all conditions, k is the size of winning-sets (i.e., the game hypergraph is k-uniform).

Breaker-Breaker game 
It is possible to play a game in which both players want to attain the goal of Breaker (i.e., have at least one element in each winning-set). Then, the game is not necessarily zero-sum - it is possible that both players will win. In fact, whenever Breaker has a winning strategy in the Maker-Breaker game, it is possible that two Breakers will both win in the Breaker-Breaker game.

An application of this strategy is an efficient algorithm for coloring a hypergraph. Suppose we want to color the vertices of a k-uniform hypergraph in two colors such that in each hyperedge, both colors are represented. However, the proof was not constructive. Using Breaker's constructive winning strategy, we can color the hypergraph  by letting two Breakers play one against the other with their winning strategies. Both players will win - so each player will have at least one vertex in every hyperedge.

Partial making 
Suppose that, in order to win, Maker does not need to occupy an entire winning-set - he only needs to own a part of such a set. When can Breaker win in this case?

Constant partial making 
m elements in one set (where Breaker does not own any element). From here the proof is the same as the Erdos-Selfridge theorem.

Fractional making 
Suppose that, in order to win, Maker needs to own only a fraction t of the elements in one winning-set, where . So Breaker needs to own a fraction larger than (1-t) of the points in every set.  Define the constant: (in the standard variant).

 If , then Breaker has a winning strategy when playing first.
 If , then Breaker has a winning strategy when playing second.

The strategy uses a potential function. If Maker occupies a set, then its potential will at some point be at least 1. Therefore, Breaker wins if he manages to keep the potential-sum below 1. Breaker's strategy is to take the element with the highest value, defined as the sum of potentials of winning-sets containing that element.

Whenever Maker takes an element, the potential of every set containing it is multiplied by 2t, so it increases by (2t-1) times the current potential. Whenever Breaker takes an element, the potential of every set containing it is multiplied by (2-2t), so it increases by (1-2t) times the current potential. Whenever Breaker and Maker both touch the same set, its potential is multiplied by 2t(2-2t), so it increases by -(2t-1)2 times the current potential. Since Breaker's element has a highest value, the potential-sum always decreases. Therefore, if the initial potential-sum is less than 1, Breaker wins.

Infinite boards 
The definition of Maker-Breaker game has a subtlety when there are infinitely many vertices  and infinitely many winning sets. In this case we say that Breaker has a winning strategy if, for all j > 0, Breaker can prevent Maker from completely occupying a winning set by turn j.

See also 

 Clique game
Arithmetic progression game
Biased positional game
Avoider-Enforcer game

References

Positional games